John Huffman (February 17, 1905 – December 24, 1979) was an American sabre fencer. He competed at the 1928, 1932 and 1936 Summer Olympics.

References

External links
 

1905 births
1979 deaths
American male sabre fencers
Olympic fencers of the United States
Fencers at the 1928 Summer Olympics
Fencers at the 1932 Summer Olympics
Fencers at the 1936 Summer Olympics
Sportspeople from Norfolk, Virginia